The FC Pipinsried is a German association football club from the town of Pipinsried, Bavaria.

The club's greatest success came in 2013 when it qualified for the southern division of the Bayernliga, the fifth tier of the German football league system, on the strength of a championship in the Landesliga Bayern-Südwest.

History
FC Pipinsried was formed in 1967 and, for most of its early history the club has been a non-descript amateur side in local Bavarian football. While based in Upper Bavaria the club opted to enter the leagues of neighboring Bavarian Swabia and started competitive football in the C-Klasse, the lowest tier of Bavarian football at the time, earning promotion to the B-Klasse in 1975. In 1978 it climber another level, now to the A-Klasse, where it immediately won another championship and earned another promotion, now to the Bezirksliga in 1979. It first rose above the leagues of Swabia in 1989 when it finished runners-up of the Bezirksoberliga Schwaben in the league's inaugural season. Pipinsried entered the Landesliga Bayern-Süd for four seasons from 1989 to 1993 but never finished higher than eleventh in that time and, at the end of it, was relegated back to the Bezirksoberliga.

The club spent the next six season back in the Bezirksoberliga Schwaben, coming close to promotion again in 1996 and 1998, when the side came third. It took out the league championship in the following season, 1998–99, and moved up to the Landesliga once more. The next thirteen seasons were spent in Landesliga Süd with Pipinsried, for the most part, being a struggler against relegation once more. From 2000 to 2003 the club had a reasonable run in the league, finishing as high as fifth in 2002, but declining once more after this. Nevertheless, FC Pipinsried survived in the Landesliga Süd until 2012 when the league was disbanded.

With the number of Landesligas expanded from three to five and the Bayernliga doubled in size, the club qualified for the promotion round to the new southern division of the Bayernliga but was knocked out by FC Gundelfingen in the first round. Instead, Pipinsried was grouped in the new Landesliga Bayern-Südwest. In this league, with a large number of former Landesliga Süd top-teams now promoted to the Bayernliga, FC Pipinsried performed rather well, narrowly taking out the inaugural league title in 2012–13. On the strength of this the club earned promotion to the southern division of the Bayernliga for 2013–14. Another strong performance the following season saw the club finish third in the Bayernliga and qualify for the Regionalliga promotion round, where it however was knocked out in the first round by TSV 1860 Rosenheim.

The club came third in the league again in 2014–15 and once more benefitted by a club above it deciding not to apply for a Regionalliga licence, thereby qualifying for the promotion round to the latter once again. Pipinsried was defeated on aggregate by VfR Garching in the first round and thereby remained at Bayernliga level.

Current squad

Honours
The club's honours:

League
 Bayernliga Süd (V)
 Champions: 2021
 Landesliga Bayern-Südwest (VI)
 Champions: 2013
 Bezirksoberliga Schwaben (V)
 Champions: 1999
 Runners-up: 1989

Recent managers
Recent managers of the club:

Recent seasons
The recent season-by-season performance of the club:

With the introduction of the Bezirksoberligas in 1988 as the new fifth tier, below the Landesligas, all leagues below dropped one tier. With the introduction of the Regionalligas in 1994 and the 3. Liga in 2008 as the new third tier, below the 2. Bundesliga, all leagues below dropped one tier. With the establishment of the Regionalliga Bayern as the new fourth tier in Bavaria in 2012 the Bayernliga was split into a northern and a southern division, the number of Landesligas expanded from three to five and the Bezirksoberligas abolished. All leagues from the Bezirksligas onwards were elevated one tier.

References

External links
 Official team site  
 Das deutsche Fußball-Archiv  historical German domestic league tables
 Manfreds Fussball Archiv  Tables and results from the Bavarian amateur leagues
 FC Pipinsried at fupa.net  

Football clubs in Germany
Football clubs in Bavaria
Football in Swabia (Bavaria)
Association football clubs established in 1967
1967 establishments in West Germany
Dachau (district)